Oliver Wakeman (born 26 February 1972) is an English musician, rock keyboardist and composer, best known as a member of Yes from 2008 to 2011, having filled the role of keyboardist previously held by his father, Rick Wakeman.

Biography
Oliver is the first son of Rick Wakeman and his first wife Rosaline Woolford and is the older brother of Adam Wakeman. His parents divorced when he was young.

Solo
He worked with Clive Nolan (of Arena) on two progressive rock concept albums, Jabberwocky (released 1999) and Hound of the Baskervilles. Tracy Hitchings appears on both albums, while Rick Wakeman (narrating) and Yes alumnus Peter Banks both appeared on Jabberwocky.

Wakeman worked with Steve Howe for several years (originally his father's bandmate in Yes and later as a bandmate when Oliver joined Yes himself). The two lived fairly close to each other in south-west England. Howe guested on Wakeman's solo album The 3 Ages of Magick, while Wakeman is on Howe's 2005 solo album Spectrum and contributed to Howe's recording of "Australia" for the US version of the Yes collection The Ultimate Yes: 35th Anniversary Collection.

Wakeman wrote a CD inspired by his visits to and experiences on Lundy, a small island in the Bristol Channel which was released originally in 1997 and then again in 1999. He toured with Bob Catley in the UK and Europe and also guested on an Ayreon project The Human Equation in 2004. Wakeman replaced keyboardist Herb Schildt for the American progressive rock band Starcastle, known for their Yes-like sound, at RoSfest (Rites of Spring festival) 2007.

During 2006 and 2007 Oliver took to the road with his band performing selections from his Mother's Ruin album as well as songs from his back catalogue. In late 2007 this show was filmed and recorded in Poland and subsequently released in 2008 as a CD/DVD package and single DVD titled Coming To Town. A single CD release appeared in 2009.

Oliver has been nominated for the Classic Rock Society's 'Best Keyboard Player' award on many occasions and has won the award three times (2006, 2007 & 2008).

He spent 2012 working with Gordon Giltrap on a new recording project titled Ravens & Lullabies which was released in 2013. They toured together throughout September and October 2012 in preparation for the album's release.

The tour continued throughout 2013, including a full band headline show at the Summer's End festival. Oliver & Gordon also appeared with singer Paul Manzi on Bob Harris' BBC Radio 2 show in June 2013.

Oliver's The 3 Ages of Magick was re-released in 2013 with bonus material and an expanded booklet.

Yes
In 2008, the official Yes website announced that Oliver Wakeman would tour with Yes in the band's 40th anniversary tour. However, the tour was postponed due to the illness of Yes singer Jon Anderson. A revamped In the Present Tour featuring Steve Howe, Chris Squire and Alan White of Yes plus Oliver Wakeman and Canadian singer Benoît David (filling in for Anderson) began in the fall of 2008, and continued into 2009. The second leg of the tour was cancelled after one date when Squire had to have an urgent leg operation on 11 February.

The band returned to touring in summer 2009 and this continued through to summer 2010. They also signed to Frontiers Records, an Italian record company.  Yes started work on an album, with Wakeman, in October/November 2010 followed by a tour of South America in November/December of that year. Though he worked with the band on the initial sessions for their first album in 10 years, Fly from Here, he was dismissed from Yes during recording. Wakeman stayed on for the Rite of Spring tour (March to early April 2011) and formally left following its completion.  Asia and Drama era Yes keyboardist Geoff Downes, who replaced Wakeman for the rest of the album's sessions, was later announced as keyboardist for its upcoming summer tour. Some of Wakeman's contributions to Fly from Here nevertheless made it onto the released version of the album, and he was credited as having co-written one track. He also appears on the Yes CD and DVD release In the Present – Live from Lyon playing all of the keyboards. Oliver also appears in the documentary film which accompanies this release.

In 2019, material Wakeman wrote and recorded with Yes was released as From a Page.

Starcastle
Oliver joined Starcastle for their April 2007 headlining performance at the Rites of Spring festival (ROSfest), an annual progressive rock festival in Pennsylvania.

Strawbs
In 2009, Wakeman joined Strawbs (another of his father's former bands) for their tours of Canada, the UK and Italy during 2009 and 2010.

He recorded an album with the band, Dancing to the Devil's Beat which was released in 2009.

In 2010 he appeared on the Strawbs 40th anniversary live double CD, Strawberry Fayre.

Wakeman was not with the band for their late 2010 tour given his prior commitment to recording with Yes.

Discography

Solo albums 
 Heaven's Isle - Oliver Wakeman - Opus Music 1997 
 Heaven's Isle - Reedited issue -Verlas Music 1999
 Chakras - Oliver Wakeman - Disky / EMI Records 2002
 Purification by Sound - Oliver Wakeman - President Records 2003
 Spiritual Enlightenment & Inspiration - Oliver Wakeman - Disky / EMI Records 2002
 Mother's Ruin - Oliver Wakeman - ProgRock Records 2005

Live albums - as Oliver Wakeman Band 
 Coming to Town - Live from Katowice (DVD & CD) - Oliver Wakeman Band - MetalMind Records 2008 - DVD, 2009 CD

Collaborations 
 Jabberwocky - Oliver Wakeman & Clive Nolan - Verglas Music 1999
 The 3 Ages of Magick - Oliver Wakeman with Steve Howe - Resurgence 2001 (re-issue - Esoteric Recordings 2013)
 The Hound of the Baskervilles - Oliver Wakeman & Clive Nolan - Verglas Music 2002
 Ravens & Lullabies - Oliver Wakeman & Gordon Giltrap - Esoteric Antenna Records 2013
 Dark Fables (also, disc 3 of Tales by Gaslight 3cd set) - Wakeman & Nolan - Elflock Records 2021

EP 
 The View From Here (EP) - Oliver Wakeman & Rachel Kaufman Wakeman - Watermark Records 2002

With The Strawbs
 Dancing to the Devil's Beat - (Witchwood Media 2009)
 Strawberry Fayre (live) - (Witchwood Media 2010)

With Yes
 In the Present – Live from Lyon (DVD & CD) - (Frontiers 2011)
 Fly from Here - Keyboard performances on 4 tracks
 From a Page

With Light Freedom Revival
Eterniverse Deja Vu (2017)
Truthonomy (2018)
Musicsoul Continuum: Jon Anderson Tribute Album (2020)

Appearances
 Blue (Paul Bond, 2013)
 Let the Song Begin (King Friday with Joe Macre, 2012)
 Strange Ang3ls (David Mark Pearce) - keyboard solo
 Timeline (best of) & The Human Equation (Ayreon)- keyboard Solo on the track "Day17: Accident?"
 One Among the Living (Mystery) - keyboard Solo on the track "Kameleon Man"
 Spectrum (Steve Howe) - keys on 4 tracks
 Integration (Hybrid) - keys on "Man on the Moon" and "Moving Lights"
 All Around the World (Prog Aid v Various artists) - keybs
 Capture Light (John Holden) - keys on 3 tracks
 Crossover (David Cross and Peter Banks, 2020)
 Rise and Fall (John Holden, 2020)
 Together Apart (John Holden and Friends, 2021)
 Some People (Inventioning with Jon Anderson, Jean-Luc Ponty and Michael Lewis, 2021)

Commissions
 Name That Tune -  CD Jingle
 The Great Epic Poems - Incidental Music
 The Great Love Poets - Incidental Music
 The Great War Poets - Incidental Music
 Poems of Natural Beauty - Incidental Music
 Heroic Poems - Incidental Music
 Lovers Trysts Poems - Incidental Music

See also
Adam Wakeman (brother)

References

External links

Official home page
 
 

1972 births
Living people
English rock keyboardists
Yes (band) members
Place of birth missing (living people)
Strawbs members